Uli Rompel (born June 25, 1944, in Teschen, Czech Republic) is a Canadian Paralympic skier. He competed in alpine skiing in the 1984 and 1988 Winter Paralympics, winning four silver medals.

References

Alpine skiers at the 1984 Winter Paralympics
Alpine skiers at the 1988 Winter Paralympics
Paralympic silver medalists for Canada
Living people
1944 births
Canadian male alpine skiers
Medalists at the 1984 Winter Paralympics
Medalists at the 1988 Winter Paralympics
Paralympic medalists in alpine skiing
Paralympic alpine skiers of Canada